Kunzea eriocalyx is a flowering plant in the myrtle family, Myrtaceae and is endemic to a small area on the south coast of Western Australia. It blooms between August and October producing pink flowers.

Description
The leaves are mostly clustered on the ends of the side branches which also have groups of flowers in the flowering season. The flowers are arranged in heads of mostly five to seven on the ends of the side branches. Flowering occurs between August and October and is followed by fruit which are urn-shaped capsules with the sepals attached.

Taxonomy and naming
Kunzea clavata was first formally described in 1860 by the botanist Ferdinand von Mueller and the description was published in the work Fragmenta Phytographiae Australiae. The type specimen was collected in the Middle Mount Barren. The specific epithet (eriocalyx) is derived from the Ancient Greek words erion meaning "wool" and  kalyx meaning "cup", "outer envelope of a flower" or sepals.

Distribution and habitat
Often found among rocky outcrops of quartzite, K. eriocalyx grows in a small area on the coast at the boundary of the Great Southern and Goldfields-Esperance regions of Western Australia centred around the Fitzgerald River National Park where it grows in sandy clay soils of laterite.

Conservation
Kunzea eriocalyx is classified as "Priority Two" by the Western Australian Government Department of Parks and Wildlife meaning that it is poorly known and from only one or a few locations.

References

eriocalyx
Endemic flora of Western Australia
Myrtales of Australia
Rosids of Western Australia
Vulnerable flora of Australia
Plants described in 1860
Taxa named by Ferdinand von Mueller